Juan María Leonardi Villasmil (February 11, 1947, Boconó – June 7, 2014) was a Roman Catholic bishop.

Ordained to the priesthood in 1979, Villasmil was named titular bishop of Lesvi and auxiliary bishop of the Roman Catholic Archdiocese of Mérida, Venezuela, in 1994. In 1997, he was appointed bishop of the Roman Catholic Diocese of Punto Fijo in 1997. He died while still in office.

Notes

1947 births
2014 deaths
People from Trujillo (state)
Venezuelan people of Italian descent
Venezuelan Roman Catholic bishops
Central University of Venezuela alumni
Pontifical Gregorian University alumni
Pontifical Lateran University alumni
Roman Catholic bishops of Punto Fijo